Expedition Robinson: 2005, was the ninth version of Expedition Robinson, or Survivor as it is referred to in some countries, to air in Sweden and it aired in 2005. The major twist this season was that the contestants were divided into tribes based on their annual salaries, with the North team being the "rich" team and the South team being the "poor" team. Another twist was that of the change in voting format, all contestants were given thirteen votes that they could use at any time and in any amount. Robert Drakwind, formerly known as Robert Andersson, returned to compete for a third time since 1999 along with his girlfriend, Anna Carin Wase. Both were "jokers" and did not enter the competition until episode 3. Both jokers became "chiefs" of one of the tribes and were given immunity at all pre-merge tribal councils, however from episode 4 on they could be challenged by any member of their tribe for the position of chief. If challenged, the chief and challenger would face off in a duel in which the winner would become chief and the loser would be eliminated from the competition. The final twist of the season was that of the "Finalist Island". Introduced in a challenge immediately preceding the merge, contestants would compete in a series of duels in which the winner would earn a spot on Finalist Island. The two contestants left on Finalist Island when only seven contestants were left would have immunity until the final four, while the remaining five contestants not on the island would have to compete for the two remaining spots. Karolina and Max were the last two contestants on Finalist Island. Ultimately, Karolina Conrad went on to win the season with a jury vote of 6–5 over Max Stjernfelt.

Finishing order

The game

Voting history

 Just prior to the merge the remaining contestants had to take part in a race to the merge meal table. The two contestants sitting at the head of the table would be the first to go to the "Finalon" island, where they would be immune from tribal council. In addition they could each select one other contestant to join them. The last contestant to reach the table would be left without a chair and eliminated from the game.
 The last four members of the Robinson tribe not on Finalon island took part in a vote and sudden death challenge where only the last remaining member after the vote and challenge would remain in the game.
 In the final tribal council of the season all remaining contestants reverted to the Robinson tribe and only Robert, who won the last immunity challenge, was immune from the vote.

Votes Used

External links
http://wwwc.aftonbladet.se/noje/tv/doku/2002/robinson/robinson.html
http://www.aftonbladet.se/nojesbladet/tv/dokusapa/article282934.ab
http://www.aftonbladet.se/nojesbladet/tv/dokusapa/article314407.ab

 2005
2005 Swedish television seasons